Pinaki Misra (born 23 October 1959) is an Indian politician from the Biju Janata Dal party; he is the current Member of Parliament in the Lok Sabha from Puri.
In 1996 he contested as the Congress candidate for Puri Lok Sabha seat and won over Braja Kishore Tripathy, the then Puri MP and Union Minister. During the 2019 General Election, Pinaki Misra defeated BJP spokesperson Sambit Patra from the Puri Constituency in a closely contested fight. He is a Senior Advocate in the Supreme Court of India and has fought cases in nearly all High Courts in India and major Tribunals in India.

Education 
Misra holds B.A.(Hons) History from St. Stephen's College, Delhi and LL.B. from Faculty of Law, University of Delhi. He is married to Smt. Sangita Misra and has one daughter and one son.

Political career 
The list of positions held chronologically listed is as follows.

See also
Indian general election, 2019 (Odisha)
Indian general election, 2014 (Odisha)
 Indian general election, 2009 (Odisha)

References

1959 births
Living people
People from Puri
Odisha politicians
Lok Sabha members from Odisha
India MPs 1996–1997
India MPs 2009–2014
India MPs 2014–2019
India MPs 2019–present
Biju Janata Dal politicians
Faculty of Law, University of Delhi alumni
Indian National Congress politicians